Dorjee Wangdi Kharma is an Indian politician who is serving as Member of 10th Arunachal Pradesh Assembly from Kalaktang Assembly constituency. In 2019 Arunachal Pradesh Legislative Assembly election, he defeated Tenzing Norbu Thongdok with the margin of 1,772 votes. In December 2020, he switched to Bharatiya Janata Party from Janata Dal (United).

References 

Indian politicians
Arunachal Pradesh MLAs 2019–2024
Year of birth missing (living people)
Living people
1963 births
People from West Kameng district
Janata Dal (United) politicians
Janata Dal (United) politicians from Arunachal Pradesh